National Road 53 is a national road of Cambodia. It connects the city of Kampong Chhnang with the town of Romeas in Kampong Chhnang Province. The road is connected to National Highway 5 via National Road 141 which links it to Prey Khmer town.

At Romeas the highway becomes National Road 142 which links it to National Road 138.

References
National Road 53 at Kampong Chham
Asian Development Bank

Roads in Cambodia